Borislav Biserov Mihaylov  (born 12 February 1963) is a Bulgarian former professional footballer, who played as a goalkeeper, and President of the Bulgarian Football Union (2005 – 2019; 2021 – present). He is also a former member of the executive committee of UEFA.

Mihaylov was captain of the Bulgaria national team during their major fourth-place run at the 1994 FIFA World Cup (during the shoot-out against Mexico at the 1/8-final stage he saved two penalties), as well as during their participation in UEFA Euro 1996. He also played at the 1986 FIFA World Cup and 1998 FIFA World Cup and is currently the second most-capped player of the Bulgaria national football team with 102 appearances, and the footballer with the most matches played (60) as captain.

Club career
In 1995, Mihaylov joined English First Division team Reading for a then club record of £800,000, replacing the departed club favourite Shaka Hislop. However his time at the club was marked by a series of injuries, and his club career in England never took off.

Administrative roles
After retiring from active sports he started a career in football administration. He was vice-president of the Bulgarian Football Union from 2001 until 2005, when he replaced Ivan Slavkov as Peruka.

On 22 March 2011, he was elected to the executive committee of UEFA.

On 15 October 2019, Mikhailov resigned as President of BFU after being asked to step down for ignoring racist behavior during games.

Personal life
In 1998, he married Maria Petrova, a former prominent rhythmic gymnast. Borislav is the son of former goalkeeper Biser Mihaylov and the father of, also goalkeeper, Nikolay Mihaylov, who is currently playing for Levski Sofia, while his younger daughter Elinor is a tennis player.

Honours
Levski Sofia
 Bulgarian Champion: 1984, 1985, 1988
 Bulgarian Cup winner: 1982, 1984, 1986
 Cup of the Soviet Army: 1984, 1987, 1988
 Bulgarian Footballer of the Year: 1986

See also
 List of men's footballers with 100 or more international caps

References

1963 births
Living people
Bulgarian footballers
C.F. Os Belenenses players
Reading F.C. players
Association football goalkeepers
Footballers from Sofia
1986 FIFA World Cup players
1994 FIFA World Cup players
UEFA Euro 1996 players
1998 FIFA World Cup players
PFC Levski Sofia players
Botev Plovdiv players
PFC Slavia Sofia players
FC Mulhouse players
Bulgaria international footballers
FIFA Century Club
FC Zürich players
First Professional Football League (Bulgaria) players
Primeira Liga players
Bulgarian expatriate footballers
Bulgarian expatriate sportspeople in England
Expatriate footballers in England
Bulgarian expatriate sportspeople in Switzerland
Expatriate footballers in Switzerland
Bulgarian expatriate sportspeople in Portugal
Expatriate footballers in Portugal
Bulgarian expatriate sportspeople in France
Expatriate footballers in France
Members of the UEFA Executive Committee